The 1933–34 international cricket season was from September 1933 to April 1934. The season consists several first-class international tours.

Season overview

December

England in India

February

MCC in Ceylon

March

MCC in India

References

International cricket competitions by season
1933 in cricket
1934 in cricket